Lucy Avril Evangelista (born 17 January 1986 in Ballymena, Northern Ireland) is a British model and the 2005 Miss Northern Ireland. and represented the nation at Miss World 2005.

Early life and career 
Evangelista was educated at Ballymena Academy and has Italian ancestry on her father's side. She won Miss Northern Ireland 2005 and was placed in the top fifteen at the 2005 Miss World contest. This was the first time Northern Ireland placed at the finals of Miss World. As the highest placed of the four UK contestants, Evangelista won the Miss United Kingdom title in 2015.

Personal life 
She is currently married to former Ulster and Irish rugby player, Matt McCullough.

References

External links 
https://web.archive.org/web/20080328044112/http://www.geocities.com/pageantmania2000c/MU2007Delegates.html

1986 births
Miss Northern Ireland winners
Female models from Northern Ireland
Miss World 2005 delegates
People from Ballymena
Living people
People educated at Ballymena Academy
British people of Italian descent